The Northumberland County Courthouse is an historic county courthouse located in Sunbury, Northumberland County, Pennsylvania. Erected in 1865, it was added to the National Register of Historic Places in 1974.

History and features
Built in 1865, the Norhumberland County Courthouse is a three-story, brick building that was designed in the Italianate style. 

A three-story wing was added in 1911. It features three arched doors on the front facade, brownstone quoins at the corners, and a clock tower with a copper dome. The tower bell was donated by Simon Cameron. 

In 1878, it was the site of the murder trial and conviction of the last Molly Maguire, Peter McManus.

Gallery

See also
 List of state and county courthouses in Pennsylvania

References

County courthouses in Pennsylvania
Courthouses on the National Register of Historic Places in Pennsylvania
Italianate architecture in Pennsylvania
Government buildings completed in 1865
Buildings and structures in Northumberland County, Pennsylvania
Sunbury, Pennsylvania
National Register of Historic Places in Northumberland County, Pennsylvania